The Flight from Woman is a book by psychiatrist Karl Stern, first published in 1965 by Farrar, Straus and Giroux. It is described as a study of the polarity of the sexes as reflected in the conflict between two modes of knowledge - scientific or rational, as contrasted with intuitive or poetic. In the course of exploring this theme Stern undertakes to provide psychological portraits of six representative figures whose thought and work have influenced modern man: Descartes, Goethe, Schopenhauer, Kierkegaard, Tolstoy, and Sartre.

Reviews

Man, Woman, and Person: Karl Stern, The Flight from Woman, Z. John Levay, M. D.  Modern Age Volume 11, Number 1, page 83 

Contemporary philosophical literature
Psychology books
1965 non-fiction books